Japan Tent is an international exchange event held in Ishikawa Prefecture, Japan, every August. 300 foreign students studying in Japan are invited to Ishikawa for a homestay program there.

History 
The first Japan Tent event was held in 1988. By 2012, over 8,400 foreign students from 160 countries and regions have participated. In 2012, 300 people from 70 countries and regions participated, selected from approximately 1,000 applicants.

Typical schedule 
Day 1 (Thursday): Arrive in Kanazawa, the capital of Ishikawa Prefecture for orientation and welcome ceremony before moving to countryside of Ishikawa. Homestay for three nights.
Day 2-3 (Fri & Sat): International exchange programs in individual towns.
Day 4 (Sunday): Back to Kanazawa. Meet another host family. Homestay for three more nights around Kanazawa.
Day 5-6 (Mon & Tue): International exchange program in Kanazawa.
Day 7 (Wednesday): Farewell ceremony.

Typical activities
 Japanese tea ceremony
 Cooking Japanese cuisine
 Wagashi (Japanese confectionery) making
 Zazen experience
 Visiting miso and soy sauce factory
 Tasting and comparing sake

References

 350 foreign students join 'Japan Tent' program | The Japan Times

External links 
 

Annual events in Japan
Education in Ishikawa Prefecture